Roberta Collins (born Roberta Lee Hefley, November 17, 1944 – August 16, 2008) was a film and television actress who was known for her attractive physique, blonde, curly hair, and Marilyn Monroe appearance. She starred in many exploitation films, including the prostitute Clara in Tobe Hooper's Eaten Alive and Matilda the Hun in the science-fiction film Death Race 2000.

Jack Hill, who directed her in The Big Doll House, said of her, "I think she could have had a great career, but she couldn't get her personal life together ... she would be fantastic one day, do everything right, and then she would be out until 4 am partying and the next day she would be useless."

Career
Collins was born Roberta Lee Hefley in 1944. She was married to Gunther Collins from 1966 to 1970 and took his surname. The couple had one child, a son named Michael. She won numerous beauty contests growing up, and was signed to a contract with a studio almost immediately after graduation from high school. Her option was not picked up, though, something that was repeated with another studio, "so that made me want to study and become a good actress", she later said.

In 1969, she was appointed queen of the Warner Bros-Seven Arts International Film Festival in Freeport, Grand Bahamas Island. She gained a level of fame with her appearance in the enormously popular The Big Doll House. This led to a series of roles in exploitation films. She worked in a number of nonexploitation roles, as well, notably on television.

In the early 1970s, Collins briefly dated Glenn Ford. In the early 1990s, she reportedly worked as a caregiver for Ford.

Death
Collins died August 16, 2008, from a reportedly accidental overdose of a cocktail of drugs and alcohol. Her son predeceased her. She is buried at the Forest Lawn Memorial Park (Hollywood Hills).

Legacy
In 2014,  a tribute to Collins was part of the St. Louis International Film Festival. Caged Heat was screened a concert was held where Stace England and the Screen Syndicate played an album of songs inspired by Roberta Collins.

Partial filmography

Lord Love a Duck (1966) – Brunette high school classmate (uncredited)
Adam-12 (1969, TV Series, episode "Log 153: Find Me a Needle") – Sally
Here Come the Brides (1970, TV Series, episode "Pat's Girl") – Pat's girl
The Bob Hope Specials (1970)
The Big Doll House (1971) – Alcott
Women in Cages (1971) – Stoke
Cade's County (1971, TV Series, episode "Requiem for Miss Madrid") – Karen Malloy
Minnie and Moskowitz (1971) – Countergirl at Pink's Hot Dogs (uncredited)
Sweet Kill (1972) – Call girl
Unholy Rollers (1972) – Jennifer
The Roommates (1973) – Beth
 Wonder Women (1973) – Laura
The Last Porno Flick (1974)
Caged Heat (1974) – Belle Tyson
Three the Hard Way (1974) – Lait's secretary
Movin' On (1974, TV series, episode "The Time of His Life") – Lucille
Kolchak: The Night Stalker (1974, TV series, episode "The Ripper") – Det. Cortazzo
The Rockford Files (1974, TV Series, episode "Exit Prentiss Carr") – Nancy Hellman
Alias Big Cherry (1975)
Death Race 2000 (1975) – Matilda the Hun
Train Ride to Hollywood (1975) – Jean Harlow
The Witch Who Came from the Sea (1976) – Clarissa
Eaten Alive (1976) – Clara
Whiskey Mountain (1977) – Diana
Speedtrap (1977) – Ms. Hastings, student driver
79 Park Avenue (1977, TV Mini-Series) – Lola
Matilda (1978) – Tanya Six
B. J. and the Bear (1979, episode "Shine On") – Ellen Smith
Saturday the 14th (1981) – Cousin Rhonda
Death Wish II (1982) – Woman at party
Hardbodies (1984) – Lana
School Spirit (1985) – Helen Grimshaw
Hardbodies 2 (1986) – Lana Logan
Vendetta (1986) – Miss Dice (final film role)

References

Further reading

External links
 

1944 births
2008 deaths
American film actresses
Actresses from Los Angeles
Drug-related deaths in California
20th-century American actresses
Burials at Forest Lawn Memorial Park (Hollywood Hills)
21st-century American women